Lanciostory, sometimes spelled as Lancio Story or LancioStory, is a weekly comic magazine published in Rome, Italy, from 1975.

History and profile 
Lanciostory was created in 1975 by Editrice Lancio to target the adult audience interested in comics who had marked the contemporary success of comics magazines such as Il Monello and Intrepido. The first issue, #0, was released in April 1975 attached to the Lancio-edited fotoromanzi magazine Le Avventure di Jacques Douglas. The magazine is published by Eura editoriale based in Rome.

The magazine initially mainly published works by South-American and especially Argentine authors, including  Carlos Trillo, Juan Giménez, Enrique Breccia, Francisco Solano López, Ernesto García Seijas, Enrique Alcatena, Eduardo Mazzitelli, Juan Zanotto. Italian collaborators included  Franco Saudelli, Paolo Eleuteri Serpieri and Massimo Rotundo. From the late 1970s Lanciostory started publishing Franco-Belgian comics.

Notable series which were introduced in the magazine include  Dago, John Doe and "Dracula in the west" also published in USA by Antarctic Press.

Each issue consists of about 6-7 episodic comics, plus several columns about cinema, sport and entertainment.

See also
 List of magazines published in Italy

Notes

1975 establishments in Italy
Comics magazines published in Italy
Italian-language magazines
Magazines established in 1975
Magazines published in Rome
Weekly magazines published in Italy